Rothe or Roethe is a surname. Notable people with the surname include:

 Bendt Rothe, Danish actor
 Camilla Rothe (born 1974), German physician and tropical medicine expert
 David Rothe (1573–1650), Irish Roman Catholic bishop
 Edward J. Roethe (1878–1952), American politician
 Erich Rothe (1895–1988), German-born American mathematician
 Jessica Rothe (born 1987), American actress
 Johannes Rothe, (1628-1702), prophetic preacher and Fifth Monarchist
 Heinrich August Rothe (1773–1842), German mathematician
 Henry Edgar Roethe (1866–1939), American politician
 Mechtild Rothe (1947), German politician
 Paul Rothe (1890-1961), German flying ace
 Peter Rothe (born 1935), German art director
 Richard Roethe (1865–1944), German military officer
 Richard Rothe (1799–1867), German theologian
 Rudolf Rothe (1873–1942), German mathematician
 Rudolph Rothe (1802–1877), Danish landscape architect
 Sjur Røthe (born 1988), Norwegian cross-country skier
 Utz Rothe (born 1940), Austrian artist
 Ursula Rothe (classicist), Australian classicist

 Rothé, a form of cattle in various roleplaying games

See also 
 Roth (disambiguation)

Surnames from nicknames